Tamara "Tammy" Boyd  (born 13 February 1980) is a track and road cyclist from New Zealand. She has been a consistent performer on road and track but she won her first senior title at the 2006 national track championships at Wanganui, winning the scratch race. She represented her nation at the 2005 UCI Road World Championships and 2006 Commonwealth Games. On the track she became national scratch champion in 2006.

References

External links
 profile at Procyclingstats.com

1980 births
New Zealand female cyclists
Living people
Cyclists at the 2006 Commonwealth Games
Commonwealth Games competitors for New Zealand